A number of vessels of the German Navy have borne the name Hipper, after Franz von Hipper.

 , a  converted to a training ship, in service between 1958–1967.

References 

German Navy ship names